The Crosby–Kugler capsule, also called the Crosby capsule, is a device used for obtaining biopsies of small bowel mucosa, necessary for the diagnosis of various small bowel diseases. This capsule was originally invented by Dr. William H Crosby to assist in diagnosing Coeliac disease.

The capsule, attached to a long tube, is swallowed.  The other end of the tube remains outside the patient's mouth. When the capsule has reached the desired section of bowel, suction is applied to the tube.  This suction triggers a mechanism in the capsule which causes a spring-loaded knife to sweep across an aperture in the capsule, cutting away any mucosa protruding into the aperture.  The capsule is then pulled up by the tube, and the biopsied tissue is retrieved from within the capsule chamber.

Since about 1980, it has been possible to perform adequate biopsies on adults during an upper endoscopy, relegating the Crosby capsule to use mainly in children.

References

Crosby WH and Kugler HW: Intraluminal biopsy of the small intestine: the intestinal biopsy capsule.
The American Journal of Digestive Diseases, May 1957, 2 (5): 236–241.
Greene HL, Rosensweig NS, Lufkin EG, Hagler L, Gozansky D, Taunton OD, Herman RH. Biopsy of the small intestine with the Crosby–Kugler capsule. Experience in 3,866 peroral biopsies in children and adults. The American Journal of Digestive Diseases, 1974 Mar;19(3):189–98.

Medical equipment